The following people were born, or have lived in, Fort Lauderdale, Florida:

Sports figures

Actors and models

Musicians
Melvin LaThomas Brimm, singer-songwriter, vocal producer, dancer-choreographer, and actor
David Cassidy, 1970s teen idol, singer and actor from the Partridge Family, died there.
David L. Cook, Christian singer, comedian,  The Cook Family Singers musician
Ian Grushka, bassist and founder of band New Found Glory (Coral Springs)
Guitar Nubbit, blues musician
Marilyn Manson, musician
Dude Mowrey, country music artist
Damien Moyal, vocalist and musician, notably of As Friends Rust, Morning Again and Shai Hulud
Nonpoint, musical group
Jaco Pastorius, influential jazz bassist
Scott Putesky (Daisy Berkowitz), former lead guitarist for Marilyn Manson
Puya, rock band
Reggie Sears, R&B/soul artist, former child prodigy blues guitarist
Archie Shepp, free jazz saxophonist
Nadine Sierra, opera singer
Ski Mask the Slump God (Stokeley Clevon Goulbourne), rapper
XXXTentacion Jahseh Dwayne Ricardo Onfroy, rapper
Mark Zeltser, concert pianist

Other notable people
Edward Buchanan, Wyoming Secretary of State and former Speaker of the Wyoming House of Representatives
James A. "Jimmie" Dallas, Sr., educator, entrepreneur, musical patron and civic leader
Fred DeLuca, founder and CEO of Subway
Arnold Denker, Chess Grandmaster and United States Chess Champion in 1945 and 1946
Eddie Egan, detective and actor
Lolita Files, author, screenwriter, and producer
Brian Patrick Flynn, interior designer
Leo Goodwin, Sr., founder of GEICO; philanthropist
Wayne Huizenga, business/civic leader
Travis Jeppesen, author
Kenneth A. Jessell, educator and 6th President of Florida International University
D. James Kennedy, televangelist, author
Todd Kohlhepp, serial killer
Chesley V. Morton, businessman, former member of the Georgia House of Representatives.
Fan Noli, Albanian scholar and politician
James Randi, magician, skeptic, and author
Mark Sanford, U.S. Representative and former Governor of South Carolina
Theodore Swinarski, Illinois state legislator
Dave Thomas, founder of Wendy's

Fictional Characters
Kenny, video game character from Telltale's The Walking Dead

References

Fort Lauderdale
 
Fort Lauderdale